Bounce to This is an album by Karl Gordon, also known as K-Gee. The album had one minor hit with "I Don't Really Care" which peaked at No. 22 on the UK Singles Chart two years prior to the album's release, but received more publicity for the song "Let's Get Nice" which he recorded with Melanie Blatt while they were both stoned about the joys of marijuana.

Track listing

References

External links
 Official K-Gee website

2002 debut albums
K-Gee albums